Wayne Dresden Bennett (November 7, 1927 – September 3, 2015) was an American politician in the state of Iowa.

Bennett was born in Schaller, Iowa. He attended Iowa State University and was a farmer. Bennett served in the Iowa House from 1973 to 1993 for district 48 from 1973 to 1983 and district 4 from 1983 to 1993. Bennett was also a state senator from the 6th district from 1993 to 1997. He died on September 3, 2015.

References

1927 births
2015 deaths
People from Sac County, Iowa
Iowa State University alumni
Farmers from Iowa
Republican Party Iowa state senators
Republican Party members of the Iowa House of Representatives